HD 40091, also known as HR 2082, is a solitary star located in the southern constellation Columba, the dove. It has an apparent magnitude of 5.54, making it faintly visible to the naked eye under ideal conditions. Based on parallax measurements from the Gaia spacecraft, the object is estimated to be 501 light years distant.

This is an evolved red giant with a stellar classification of M0 III. It has 121% the mass of the Sun but has expanded to 52.43 times its girth. HD 40091 is slightly metal enriched, having an iron abundance 38% above solar levels. 

HD 40091 is found to vary between 5.64 and 5.68 in the Hipparcos passband, but it is not confirmed to be a variable star. Therefore, it is catalogued in the GCVS as a suspected variable.

References

M-type giants
Suspected variables
Columba (constellation)
Columbae, 60
CD-39 02260
40091
27955
2082